Cimarron Strip is an American Western television series starring Stuart Whitman as Marshal Jim Crown. The series was produced by the creators of Gunsmoke, and aired on CBS from September 1967 to March 1968. Reruns of the original show were aired in the summer of 1971. Cimarron Strip is one of only three 90-minute weekly Western series that aired during the 1960s (the others are The Virginian, and for one season, Wagon Train), and the only 90-minute series of any kind to be centered primarily around one lead character in almost every episode. The series theme and pilot incidental music were written by Maurice Jarre, who also scored Lawrence of Arabia and Doctor Zhivago.

The series is set in the late 1880s in the Cimarron Territory, which became the Oklahoma Panhandle in 1890. For complex historical reasons, this rugged strip of land existed as a virtually ungoverned U.S. territory for several decades. It was sometimes called No Man's Land, with a reputation for lawlessness and vigilante activity. On the show, Marshal Jim Crown is trying to bring order to the region before its political status is finally resolved.

Plot outline
The Cherokee Outlet across the Cimarron River was the last free homestead land in America. It was leased and controlled by cattlemen, and the newly arriving farmers were expecting authorities in Washington to send news that they would be given rights to the land, for which they had been campaigning. U.S. Marshal Jim Crown (Stuart Whitman), who led a rather wild life and had cleaned up Abilene, was assigned to the town of Cimarron. He arrives to find that the sheriff has resigned, leaving Crown on his own to settle the increasing unrest caused by the news he brings, that the cattlemen's leases have been revoked and a final decision on the land is postponed indefinitely. With no sheriff and no support from Army troops, Crown is on his own to keep law and order in this borderland between the Kansas Territory and Indian Territory.

Dulcey Coopersmith (Jill Townsend), born in England in 1869, arrives in Cimarron City on the same train as Marshal Crown, two months after her mother's death in Providence. Dulcey worked as an upstairs maid and traveled to Cimarron to be with her father, whom she had not seen since the age of five, only to discover he had been killed by a beer wagon. Her father's partner was MacGregor (Percy Herbert), a Scotsman, who had let the Wayfarer's Inn fall into disrepair. He was a retired colonel in Her Majesty's (Queen Victoria) forces.  Another  of Dulcey's father's friends was Francis Wilde (Randy Boone), born in St. Louis and trying to make his way in the world as a reporter and photographer.

Crown wears a U.S. Marshal badge that is seen in close-up in the show's opening title sequence. MacGregor, Francis, and another character are seen in various episodes wearing a Deputy U.S. Marshals badge. The badge with that wording is shown in a close camera angle in the episode "The Deputy".

In the original flashback episode "The Battleground", Dulcey tells Marshal Crown her age is 18. Crown says he is 35.

In the episode "Nobody", Dulcey describes MacGregor as her business partner in the Wayfarer's Inn and decisions regarding its operation are shared responsibilities.

Regular cast
Stuart Whitman as Marshal Jim Crown
Jill Townsend as Dulcey Coopersmith
Percy Herbert as MacGregor
Randy Boone as Francis Wilde

Recurring characters
Jack Braddock as Fabrizio the bartender of the Wayfarers Inn (seven episodes)
Andrew Duggan as Major Ben Covington of the nearest Army fort (three episodes)
Warren Oates as Mobeetie, a cowboy (two episodes)
Karl Swenson as Doctor Kihlgren (six episodes)
Robert J. Wilke as Hardy Miller (two episodes)

Several actors appeared in more than one episode playing a different character each time.
For example, Al Wyatt Sr. played five different episodic characters, and those who played three different characters in three separate episodes include Gregg Palmer and Morgan Woodward. It was not unusual for actors to be recast in Westerns at that time, however.

Production notes

Cimarron Strip was created (though he only received "developed by" credit) by Christopher Knopf, who also served as supervising producer. Philip Leacock was executive producer. The series was produced in association with the Stuart Whitman Corporation (Stuart Whitman, Inc. on later episodes).

Set in Oklahoma, the series was shot at CBS Studio Center in Studio City, Los Angeles. Other shooting locations included the Alabama Hills near Lone Pine, California; Bishop, California; Kanab, Utah; and Tucson, Arizona.

In sharp contrast to the producers' other series, Gunsmoke, critics routinely singled out the comparatively weak supporting cast.

Science-fiction writer Harlan Ellison wrote episode 18, "Knife in the Darkness", featuring a murderer who may or may not be Jack the Ripper, and has an incidental music score by Bernard Herrmann, famous for his Citizen Kane and Alfred Hitchcock movie soundtracks. In a sartorial departure, Stuart Whitman wore a full suit through most of the episode, accentuating the fog-enshrouded Londonesque atmosphere.

The actual running time of each 90-minute episode, less the commercials, was 72 minutes. With 23 episodes filmed, 27.6 hours of Cimarron Strip exist.

Cimarron Strip aired on Thursdays opposite ABC's The Flying Nun, Batman, Bewitched, NBC's Daniel Boone, and Ironside. Due to low ratings coupled with high production costs, the series was cancelled after one season.

Stuart Whitman as Marshal Jim Crown was featured on the November 4, 1967 cover of TV Guide.

Episode list

Home media
On May 27, 2014, Entertainment One released the complete series on DVD in Region 1.

Syndication
UK digital network 5Spike (now Paramount Network) used to air episodes of the show at random days and random times, as movies. Previously, the show aired on Movies4Men, now known as Sony Movies Action. US over-the-air network Decades also aired episodes of the show for one day in October 2015.

References

External links
 
 

1967 American television series debuts
1968 American television series endings
CBS original programming
Television series by CBS Studios
Television shows set in Oklahoma
1960s Western (genre) television series
Television series set in the 1880s